Mihai Cabac (born 2 September 1986) is a Moldovan footballer who plays for Moldovan National Division club FC Speranța Crihana Veche as a defender.

References 

Living people
Moldovan footballers
Association football defenders
FC Dacia Chișinău players
FC Milsami Orhei players
FC Costuleni players
FC Veris Chișinău players
FC Speranța Crihana Veche players
1986 births